Wanon Niwat is a district (amphoe) in the northern part of Sakon Nakhon province, northeast Thailand.

Etymology
The name of the district means 'house of monkeys', which refers to the old name of the area, Kut Ling (กุดลิง). Ling is the Thai word for 'monkey', however in this case it is the name of a tree. Thus the old name meant 'Water which stops flowing at Ling trees'.

Geography
Neighboring districts are (from the north clockwise) Ban Muang, Kham Ta Kla, Akat Amnuai, Phanna Nikhom, Phang Khon, Sawang Daen Din and Charoen Sin.

Environment
Potash deposits were discovered in the area in the late-1970s. The Chinese state-owned China Ming Ta Potash Corporation, gained permission for five years to explore 120,000 rai of land in the district in 2015. Residents of the district's 82 villages are concerned about the potential environmental impacts of mining projects. Potash mining produces large quantities of salt tailings. Residents are worried that the new potash mine will cause environmental problems like high salt concentration in the soil, contamination of water sources, and soil subsidence.

Administration
The district is divided into 14 sub-districts (tambons), which are further subdivided into 175 villages (mubans). Wanon Niwat is a sub-district municipality (thesaban tambon) which covers parts of tambon Wanon Niwat. There are a further 14 tambon administrative organizations (TAO).

References

External links
amphoe.com (Thai)

Wanon Niwat